Stanley Nyagah (1936–2005), nicknamed Kĩthũng'a, was a Kenyan educationist, civil servant, technocrat and, entrepreneur who, between 1983 -1988,  served as Member of Parliament for Embu North constituency, now split into Runyenjes constituency and Manyatta constituency. His campaign symbol was a key (rũvungoro). The key symbolized the opening up of hitherto inaccessible public resources to the masses. While in parliament, he served on the public investments committee. 

He is credited with being a visionary and development oriented leader. Nyagah initiated a rural electrification programme, piped water supply system and improvements in the road network in Embu North. He helped set up two boarding primary schools (Kubukubu and Kamûthatha).

Since there were no roads in the forest, the truck would flatten vegetation to carve out a path.

Nyagah was born on the slopes of Mt Kenya at Ka-mavĩndĩ (the place of bones) farm in Mũkũũrĩ sub-location on 12th September 1936 to Esther Kerû and Stanley Ngaithia, the 4th of their 10 children. He belongs to the Rwamba clan.  

He went to Muragari School. Thereafter, he attended St Paul's High School - Kevote and went for 'A' levels in Uganda, before proceeding to the US. He enrolled at the University of Wisconsin for his BA and Syracuse University - Maxwell School of Government in upstate New York for his MPA, graduating summa cum laude. He lived and worked in Bedford, UK while he studied accounting and was the first Kenyan to receive certification from the Association of Chartered Certified Accountants (ACCA), the global body for professional accountants.  

On 1st July 1967, he was appointed the head of department (local government) at the Kenya Institute of Administration (now the  Kenya School of Government). Later, Nyagah rose to the position of deputy principal at the same institution.

He founded the Kenya Accountants and Secretaries National Examinations Board (KASNEB) in 1969 and served as its pioneer secretary.

In the 1970s he worked as a senior deputy permanent secretary in the Office of the President in the Directorate of Personnel Management. He was an authority in local government and public policy/finance.

Upon retirement in 1988, he cultivated his coffee estates, particularly the 'Rûiru 11' variety of the Arabica coffee plant. Nyagah processed the coffee beans at his mill which he then supplied to the Kenya Planters' Cooperative Union at Sagana. He was a dairy farmer and reared Friesian, Jersey and Guernsey cows.

Nyagah died in 2005 following a period of infirmity.

He is survived by his widow Jane and, 6 children.

References

Kenyan politicians
1930s births
2005 deaths